Balinas is a surname of Spanish origin. People with that name include:

 Antonio Rodríguez Balinas (1928-2011), first commander of the Office of the First U.S. Army Deputy Command. 
 Rosendo Balinas Jr. (1941-1998), chess grandmaster from the Philippines

See also
 Balina, a surname
 Bâlines, a commune in the Eure department in Normandy in northern France
 

Surnames of Spanish origin